Malcolm Root FGRA (born 1950) is a British artist who concentrates on classic transport subjects.

Bibliography 

 Malcolm Root's Transport Paintings Halsgrove (2002) 
 Malcolm Root's Railway Paintings
 Malcolm Root's: A Pageant of Transport
 The Railway Paintings of Malcolm Root

References

British railway artists
20th-century British painters
British male painters
21st-century British painters
1950 births
Living people
20th-century British male artists
21st-century British male artists